Fabio Cristian Chiarodia (born 5 June 2005) is a professional footballer, who plays as a centre-back or a defensive midfielder for Werder Bremen. Born in Germany, he has represented Italy at youth international level.

Club career
Born in Oldenburg, Germany, to Italian parents from Cinto Caomaggiore, Chiarodia started playing football at local club VfL Oldenburg, before joining Werder Bremen's youth sector in 2014. After coming through the youth ranks of Grün-Weiß, he signed his first professional contract with the club in October 2021, aged 16.

Chiarodia made his professional debut on 10 December 2021, coming on as a late substitute in Werder Bremen's 3–2 away win against Jahn Regensburg in the 2. Bundesliga. At 16 years and 188 days, he was the youngest first-team player in the club's history; he also became the second youngest player to feature in the German second tier, behind only Efe-Kaan Sihlaroglu.

On 19 October 2022, Chiarodia made his first DFB-Pokal appearance against SC Paderborn, becoming the youngest Werder Bremen player to have featured in the competition. He came on as a substitute for Niklas Schmidt in the 73rd minute and played through extra-time, before his side eventually lost the match after penalties. Three days later, he made his Bundesliga debut, being substituted on late in a match against SC Freiburg. He became the youngest Werder Bremen player to appear in the Bundesliga, at the age of 17 years, four months and 17 days. On 17 March 2023, the defender made his first professional start in a 2–2 league draw against Borussia Mönchengladbach: at 17 years, nine months and 12 days, he broke the club's record for the youngest starter in a Bundesliga match, previously held by Nick Woltemade.

International career
Born in Germany to Italian parents, Chiarodia could choose to represent both countries internationally. After receiving a call-up from the German Under-15 national team, he has represented Italy at youth international level since, having featured for the Under-15, Under-17 and Under-19 national teams.

In May 2022, he was included in the Italian squad that took part in the UEFA European Under-17 Championship in Israel, where the Azzurrini reached the quarter-finals before losing to eventual runners-up Netherlands. In December 2022, he was involved in a training camp led by the Italian senior national team's manager, Roberto Mancini, and aimed to the most promising national talents.

Style of play 
Chiarodia is a centre-back, who can also play as a defensive midfielder or a left-back. Comfortable on the ball, he has good physical and technical skills (being able to use both feet), and has his main strengths in his passing, his anticipation and his calm approach.

Personal life 
Chiarodia has an older sister and an older brother; the latter has played football in the German lower leagues. His father and his uncle own an ice cream parlour in their local town, Oldenburg.

When he first broke through the first team at Werder Bremen, he was nicknamed Das Küken ("The chick") by the club's captain, Marco Friedl.

Career statistics

Club

References

External links
 
 
 

Living people
2005 births
Sportspeople from Oldenburg
German people of Italian descent
Italian footballers
German footballers
Association football central defenders
Association football midfielders
Italy youth international footballers
2. Bundesliga players
VfL Oldenburg players
SV Werder Bremen players
SV Werder Bremen II players
Footballers from Lower Saxony